Wendit is a populated place in East Java, Indonesia. It is located at -7.9525 North, 112.674 East.

References

Populated places in East Java